The 1975 Sandown 250 was an endurance race for Group C Touring Cars held at the Sandown circuit in Victoria, Australia on 14 September 1975.
Race distance was 130 laps of the 3.11 km circuit, totalling . It was the tenth running of the race which would become the "Sandown 500" and was Round 2 of the 1975 Australian Manufacturers' Championship.

The race was won by Peter Brock driving a Holden Torana LH SL/R 5000 L34.

Classes
Car competed in four classes:
 3001 c.c. and over
 2001c.c. to 3000 c.c.
 1301 c.c. to 2000 c.c.
 Up to 1300 c.c.

Results

References

External links 
 Touring Cars 1975 (including Sandown 250) 
 Sandown 250, touringcarracing.net, as archived at web.archive.org

Motorsport at Sandown
Sandown 250
Pre-Bathurst 500